Børsa is the administrative centre of the municipality of Skaun in Trøndelag county, Norway. The village lies along the shore of the Gaulosen, an arm off the vast Trondheimsfjorden. Historically, this village was the administrative centre of the old municipality of Børsa from 1838 until 1965.  [

Børsa Church is located in the village as is a school, several shops and restaurants, banks and businesses, and the municipal government offices.

Media gallery

References

Villages in Trøndelag
Skaun